Groß Siemz is a village and a former municipality in the Nordwestmecklenburg district, in Mecklenburg-Vorpommern, Germany. Since May 2019, it is part of the new municipality Siemz-Niendorf.

References

Nordwestmecklenburg
Former municipalities in Mecklenburg-Western Pomerania